Taatsiin Tsagaan Lake (Taatsiin Tsagaan Nuur) is a large saline lake in Övörkhangai Province in the Gobi Desert of southern Mongolia.  

 and the nearby Böön Tsagaan Lake, Adgiin Tsagaan Lake, and Orog Lake, are collectively designated a Ramsar wetland of international importance under the name "Valley of the Lakes". These lakes are known to be an important staging area for migratory waterfowl, and it has been suggested that they might be a breeding area for the rare Relict Gull.

See also
 Ramsar sites in Mongolia
 Böön Tsagaan Lake

References

Lakes of Mongolia
Gobi Desert
Endorheic lakes of Asia
Saline lakes of Asia
Övörkhangai Province
Ramsar sites in Mongolia